Chonburi (IAST:) is the capital of Chonburi Province and Mueang Chonburi District in Thailand. It is about 100 km southeast of Bangkok, on the coast of the Gulf of Thailand. Its name means 'city of water'. Chonburi, along with other areas along the coast to Pattaya, forms a conurbation known as the Pattaya-Chonburi Metropolitan Area.

Chonburi has had town (thesaban mueang) status since 1935.

Climate
Chonburi has a tropical savanna climate (Köppen climate classification Aw). Winters are fairly dry and very warm. The monsoon season runs from May through October, with heavy rain and somewhat cooler temperatures during the day, although nights remain warm.

Transportation
The main road through Chonburi is Thailand Route 3, also known as Sukhumvit Road. To the northwest it connects to Bangkok and to south it connects to Rayong, Chanthaburi, and Trat. Route 344 leads east to Klaeng, also on Route 3. Route 7 runs parallel to Route 3 but bypasses the densely populated coastal area, connecting to the beach resort city of Pattaya.

Tourism
A number of beaches and Khao Sam Muk hill by the Bangkok Bay seashore are important tourist attractions in Chonburi city.

Military
Unithai Shipyard will serve as the main facility to repair United States Navy ships in the Thailand area.

Notable people
 
 
Wasan Charam (born 1989), footballer
Kantadhee Kusiri (born 1993), racing driver
Dechapol Puavaranukroh (born 1997), World Champion badminton player
Kunlavut Vitidsarn (born 2001), badminton player

References

External links

http://www.chonburicity.go.th/ Website of the city

Populated places in Chonburi province